Skeleton Man is a 2004 made-for-tv slasher film directed by Johnny Martin and starring Michael Rooker and Casper Van Dien. It was aired from Sci Fi Channel on March 1, 2004. In the film, the titular Skeleton Man stalks a squad of soldiers.

Plot
The film opens with an archaeologist looking at some artifacts he has dug up from an Indian burial ground.  Among these items is the skull of an Indian chief, Skeleton Man appears through a portal and kills the archaeologist. Skeleton Man then chases the archaeologist's assistant to a power plant, killing her and the two men working there.

Skeleton Man, now on horseback, kills a soldier and chases his partner. Before being killed, the second soldier manages to record a video and send it back to his bosses. They receive it and send in Delta Force to deal with this unknown threat.

As they advance, a female soldier falls behind and is impaled through the chest. The team finds an old Indian man who tells them that Skeleton Man, known as Cottonmouth Joe, was a genocidal warrior who killed the old man's tribe and is now stalking the soldiers. The team pays him no heed.

Meanwhile, Cottonmouth Joe slaughters the workers at an oil pumping station. That night, two sentries are also killed (but are technically MIA as their bodies are never found). The team's scout (Casper Van Dien) also disappears.

The next day, the team encounters Cottonmouth Joe. The heavy weapons specialist charges him but is killed and the team opens fire to no effect. A support helicopter of Citizen's Militia is also destroyed. One man goes to recover the heavy weapons specialist's body but finds it missing. The squad then discovers the team scout, whom they accidentally shot in the firefight (Cottonmouth Joe having captured him and put him in a location to be shot). The team tries to lure their adversary into a trap, but run out of ammo. Another trooper is killed, as is the team sharpshooter who has her skull crushed by a tomahawk.

The two remaining troopers (Captain Leary (Michael Rooker) and Lieutenant Scott (Sarah Ann Schultz) again try to lure Cottonmouth Joe into a trap to no avail. Skeleton man ends his pursuit of them and heads to a nearby chemical plant where he kills several workers, two guards, the manager and several scientists. The two remaining soldiers arrive and find the place surrounded by law enforcement. Captain Leary takes a sheriff's Armsel Striker and goes to confront the undead adversary. After a cat-and-mouse chase through the chemical plant, Captain Leary lures Cottonmouth Joe into a generator room and blows him up with electric current.

As the film's credits begin to roll, they suddenly reverse and show Skeleton Man back on his horse in the woods, thus indicating that he has survived.

Cast
 Jackie Debatin as Sergeant Cordero
 Eric Etebari as Lieutenant York
 Jonathon Klein as Power House Supervisor
 Robert Miano as Blind Indian
 Timothy V. Murphy as Sergeant Terry
 Maurice Nehru as Fighting Indian
 Lisa Rodriguez as Sergeant Smith
 David E. Ornston as Ross
 Carlos Rodriguez as Warrior Prince
 Michael Rooker as Captain Leary
 Bill M. Ryusaki as Ancient Medicine Man
 Paul Sampson as Nathan
 Sarah Ann Schultz as Lieutenant Scott
 Booboo Stewart as Child Warrior
 Maegan Stewart as Indian Princess
 Nils Allen Stewart as Sergeant Rodriguez
 Renee Stewart as Warrior
 Noa Tishby as Sergeant Davis
 Joey Travolta as The Sheriff
 Jerry Trimble as Staff Sergeant Lawrence
 Dominiquie Vandenberg as Cottonmouth Joe
 Casper Van Dien as Staff Sergeant Oberron
 Natalie Alexander as Lab Tech
 Carlos Buti as Indian Prince
 Paul Dion Monte as Shaman
 Andrew Stubblefield as Scared Construction Worker
 Ernesto Trinidad as Police Officer 1
 Mike Wike as Dead Savage

Release

Skeleton Man was released on DVD by MTI Home Video on November 22, 2005. It was later released by Echo Bridge Home Entertainment on June 5, 2007 as a three-disk pack with Raging Sharks (2005), and Lifepod (1993). Echo Bridge would re-release the film multiple times in 2008, 2009, and 2010. The company would last release the film on February 7, 2012, as a part of its two-disk, Midnight Horror Collection Pack.

Reception
Critical reception for the film has been extremely negative with critics panning the film's plot, acting, and monster costume.

Dread Central gave the film a positive and negative review stating, "This is one of those movies that requires two distinct ratings based on what frame of mind you’re in when you sit down to watch it. The only reason anyone should ever watch Skeleton Man is to either gawk at how unbelievably inept it is or to have bad movie night with some friends to do a little MST3K riffing at home. If you go into the movie with that attitude then I assure you it will deliver like few films you’ll ever witness. If you go into the movie looking for a legitimate movie watching experience then you better prepare yourself for one of the worst of your life. Either way, Skeleton Man is guaranteed to leave you in a state of shock and awe".

References

External links
 

2004 television films
2004 horror films
Fictional skeletons
Nu Image films
American supernatural horror films
Syfy original films
2004 films
Films shot in Bulgaria
American horror television films
Native American cemeteries in popular culture
American slasher films
2000s slasher films
Supernatural slasher films
2000s English-language films
2000s American films